Luboš Přibyl (born 16 October 1964) is a Czech former football goalkeeper. He played in the Czechoslovak First League and later the Gambrinus liga, making 348 top-flight appearances in total.

References

External links

Profile at fczbrno.cz 

1964 births
Sportspeople from Pardubice
Living people
Czech footballers
Czechoslovak footballers
Czechoslovakia under-21 international footballers
Association football goalkeepers
Czech First League players
SK Slavia Prague players
FK Hvězda Cheb players
SK Sigma Olomouc players
FC Zbrojovka Brno players